Reza Hassanzadeh (born 1964 in Tehran, Iran) is a retired Iranian football player who played for Esteghlal Tehran for most of his career. He played defender in Esteghlal Tehran and Team Melli for almost a decade in 90's. During his professional career he scored 2 important goals. one of them was against Liaoning FC in 1990–91 Asian Club Championship Final. Reza scored Tehran giants first goal which later Samad Marfavi scored second goal and helped Esteghlal FC to win Asian title for second time.
Reza also scored Team Melli's first goal against Japan in Asia (AFC).

Beach Soccer career
After his retirement from professional football, he played for Iran in 2006. He was Team Melli's captain in 2006 AFC Beach Soccer Championship which was qualification for 2006 FIFA Beach Soccer World Cup which he helped Team Melli to secure place in world cup for a very first time.

After retirement
He is now working in Tehran Municipality as Sports Consultant.

References

1964 births
Esteghlal F.C. players
Iranian footballers
Expatriate footballers in Kuwait
1992 AFC Asian Cup players
Living people
Iran international footballers
Asian Games gold medalists for Iran
Asian Games medalists in football
Footballers at the 1990 Asian Games
Association football defenders
Medalists at the 1990 Asian Games
Kuwait SC players
Kuwait Premier League players
Iranian expatriate sportspeople in Kuwait
Iranian expatriate footballers
Rah Ahan players
Pegah Gilan players